Mayhall is an English surname. Notable people with the surname include:

Dorothy Mayhall (1925–1995), American museum director and sculptor
Jane Mayhall (1918–2009), American poet

English-language surnames